C.W. Parker Carousel No. 825 is a carousel which was listed on the National Register of Historic Places in 2017. It is located at 109 9th Ave. S. in Faulkton in Faulk County, South Dakota.

It has also been known as Happy Times Carousel.

References

Carousels on the National Register of Historic Places
National Register of Historic Places in Faulk County, South Dakota